Calafat is a city in Dolj County, southern Romania, in the region of Oltenia. It lies on the river Danube, opposite the Bulgarian city of Vidin, to which it is linked by the Calafat-Vidin Bridge, opened in 2013. After the destruction of the bridges of late antiquity, for centuries Calafat was connected with the southern bank of the Danube by boat, and later on by ferryboat.
 
The city administers three villages: Basarabi, Golenți and Ciupercenii Vechi.

History
It was founded in the 14th century by Genoese colonists. These colonists generally employed large numbers of workmen (Calafatis) in repairing ships. This industry gave the town its name.

In January 1854, during the Crimean War, when Russian forces were headed up the Danube, Ahmed Pasha, commanding the Turkish forces at Calafat, made a surprise attack on the temporary Russian garrison nearby Cetate, which was under the command of Colonel .  This diverted the initial Russian attack and allowed Ahmed Pasha to consolidate his forces in Calafat.  On 28 January, the Russians under the command of General Joseph Carl von Anrep, reached Calafat and began the siege which lasted until May. Riddled by disease and unable to take the town, Anrep withdrew.

Calafat was declared a municipiu in 1997.

Climate

Transport

Calafat lies on the river corridor VII-Danube and the pan-European corridor IV which starts in Germany and ends in Istanbul and Thessaloniki . The city is at crossroads of National Roads DN56, DN56A, and DN55A and European route E79. The city of Calafat and its neighbour, Vidin (Bulgaria), are linked by bridge over the Danube in the area called Bașcov (Danube Bridge 2) built by the Spanish company FCC. The project of constructing a Danubian bridge in the area of Calafat–Vidin dates back to 1925. Road traffic between Vidin and Calafat were doubling every year, so it became necessary to construct a bridge with four lanes of road traffic, a railway line, a lane two meters wide for bikes and a pavement for pedestrians. The bridge has a total length of 1,971 m and its costs are estimated about  US$200 million. It was officially opened on 14 June 2013.

Newspapers

Calafat has several city newspapers. One of them is called Ziarul De Calafat, which is also maintained online; another one is Calafat Live.

International relations

Twin towns — Sister cities
Calafat is twinned with:
  Vidin, Bulgaria
  Zaječar, Serbia
  Biñan, Philippines

References

External links

 

Populated places on the Danube
Populated places in Dolj County
Localities in Oltenia
Cities in Romania
Port cities and towns in Romania
Bulgaria–Romania border crossings
Planned cities in Romania